Natasha Trethewey (born April 26, 1966) is an American poet who was served as United States Poet Laureate from 2012 to 2014. She won the 2007 Pulitzer Prize in Poetry for her 2006 collection Native Guard, and is a former Poet Laureate of Mississippi.

Trethewey is the Board of Trustees Professor of English at Northwestern University.  She previously served as the Robert W. Woodruff Professor of English and Creative Writing at Emory University, where she taught from 2001 to 2017.

Trethewey was elected in 2019 both to the American Academy of Arts and Letters and as a Chancellor of the Academy of American Poets. Academy of American Poets Chancellor David St. John said Trethewey “is one of our formal masters, a poet of exquisite delicacy and poise who is always unveiling the racial and historical inequities of our country and the ongoing personal expense of these injustices. Rarely has any poetic intersection of cultural and personal experience felt more inevitable, more painful, or profound.” Trethewey was elected to the American Philosophical Society in 2022.

Family
Natasha Trethewey was born in Gulfport, Mississippi, on April 26, 1966, Confederate Memorial Day, to Eric Trethewey and Gwendolyn Ann Turnbough. Her parents had traveled to Ohio to marry because their marriage was illegal in Mississippi at the time of Trethewey's birth, a year before the U.S. Supreme Court struck down anti-miscegenation laws with Loving v. Virginia. Her birth certificate noted the race of her mother as "colored", and the race of her father as "Canadian".

Trethewey's mother, Gwendolyn Ann Turnbough, was a social worker and part of the inspiration for Native Guard (2006), which is dedicated to her memory. Trethewey's parents divorced when she was six and Turnbough was murdered in 1985 by her second husband, whom she had recently divorced, when Trethewey was 19 years old. Recalling her reaction to her mother's death, she said: "that was the moment when I both felt that I would become a poet and then immediately afterward felt that I would not. I turned to poetry to make sense of what had happened."

Trethewey's father, Canadian emigrant Eric Trethewey, was also a poet and a professor of English at Hollins University.

Trethewey is married to historian Brett Gadsden.

Education
Trethewey earned her B.A. degree in English from the University of Georgia, an M.A. in English and Creative Writing from Hollins University, and an M.F.A. in poetry from the University of Massachusetts Amherst in 1995. In May 2010 Trethewey delivered the commencement speech at Hollins University and was awarded an honorary doctorate. She had previously received an honorary degree from Delta State University in her native Mississippi.

Poetry

Structurally, her work combines free verse with more structured, traditional forms such as the sonnet and the villanelle. Thematically, her work examines "memory and the racial legacy of America". Trethewey's first published collection, Domestic Work (2000), was the inaugural recipient of the Cave Canem prize for a first book by an African American poet. The book explores the work and lives of black men and women in the South.

Bellocq's Ophelia (2002), for example, is a collection of poetry in the form of an epistolary novella; it tells the fictional story of a mixed-race prostitute who was photographed by E. J. Bellocq in early 20th-century New Orleans.

Her work, Beyond Katrina, published in 2015 by the University of Georgia Press, is an account of the devastating events that happened after the hurricane hit the Mississippi Gulf Coast. This novel tells of how her friends, family, and neighbors were affected by the damage of Hurricane Katrina. Her writing includes themes of race conflicts, memories of her family background, and the economic effects of what the hurricane caused. Although it is a novel, she includes her poetry to capture the events that were caused beyond the hurricane itself. She also tackles what it's like being an African American in a troubled state of circumstance with the place where one grew up and loves. 
Trethewey found inspiration for her novel in Robert Penn Warren's book Segregation: The Inner Conflict in the South. Trethewey includes pictures throughout her book alongside her writing. These serve as a visual device, to aid in the readers understanding of the novel.

The American Civil War makes frequent appearances in her work. Born on Confederate Memorial Day—exactly 100 years afterwards—Trethewey explains that she could not have "escaped learning about the Civil War and what it represented", and that it had fascinated her since childhood. For example, her 2006 book Native Guard tells the story of the Louisiana Native Guards, an all-black regiment in the Union Army, composed mainly of former slaves who enlisted, that guarded the Confederate prisoners of war.

United States Poet Laureate

On June 7, 2012, James Billington, the Librarian of Congress, named her the 19th US Poet Laureate.  Billington said, after hearing her poetry at the National Book Festival, that he was "immediately struck by a kind of classic quality with a richness and variety of structures with which she presents her poetry … she intermixes her story with the historical story in a way that takes you deep into the human tragedy of it." Newspapers noted that unlike most poets laureate, Trethewey is in the middle of her career. She was also the first laureate to take up residence in Washington, D.C., when she did so in January 2013.

Trethewey was appointed for a second term as US Poet Laureate in 2013, and as several previous multiyear laureates had done, Trethewey took on a project, which took the form of a regular section on PBS News Hour called "Where Poetry Lives". On May 14, 2014, Trethewey delivered her final lecture to conclude her second term as US Poet Laureate.

Positions

She has held appointments at Duke University, as the Lehman Brady Joint Chair Professor of Documentary and American Studies, and at Emory University, where she was Robert W. Woodruff Professor of English and Creative Writing; the University of North Carolina-Chapel Hill; and Yale University.

Bibliography

Poetry

 
 
 
  (Poetry, essays, and letters)

As editor

Memoir

Awards
 2021 Anisfield-Wolf Book Award for Memorial Drive
 2020 Bobbitt National Prize for Poetry for Lifetime Achievement 
 2018  Sidney Lanier Prize for Southern Literature
2017  22nd Annual Heinz Award in the Arts and Humanities
 2016 Academy of American Poets Fellowship
 2015 PEN Oakland – Josephine Miles Literary Award
 2012  United States Poet Laureate
 2012  Poet Laureate of Mississippi
 2012  Golden Plate Award of the American Academy of Achievement
 2011  Georgia Writers Hall of Fame Inductee
2009 James Weldon Johnson Fellow in African American Studies at Yale's Beinecke Library.
2008 Georgia Woman of the Year by the Georgia Commission on Women
 2007  Pulitzer Prize for Poetry
 2004  Fellowship from the Rockefeller Foundation for residency at the Bellagio Study Center
 2003  Fellowship from the John Simon Guggenheim Memorial Foundation
 2001, 2003, 2007  Mississippi Institute of Arts and Letters Book Prizes
 2001, 2007 Lillian Smith Book Award
 2000  Bunting Fellowship for the Radcliffe Institute for Advanced Study, Harvard University
 1999  First Annual Cave Canem Foundation Poetry Prize for Domestic Work, selected by Rita Dove
 1999  Literature Fellowship from the National Endowment for the Arts

References

External links

 Natasha Trethewey: Online Resources at the Library of Congress 
U.S. Poet Laureate Natasha Tretheway Speaks at AUS
Faculty bio at Emory
Natasha Trethewey on Southern Spaces
 Trethewey reading from The Native Guard  February 2006, in Blackbird: an online journal of literature and the arts, Virginia Commonwealth University, Richmond, Volume 5, No. 1 (Spring 2006)
Trethewey interview with Daniel Cross Turner for Waccamaw: A Journal of Contemporary Literature (Fall 2011)

 
 Natasha Trethewey Poems and Profile at Poets.org
 "Natasha Trethewey" at Poetry Foundation.
 Biography and Poems of Natasha Trethewey at Americanpoems.com
 Stuart A. Rose Manuscript, Archives, and Rare Book Library, Emory University: Natasha Trethewey papers, 1942-2013

University of Massachusetts Amherst MFA Program for Poets & Writers alumni
University of Georgia alumni
Pulitzer Prize for Poetry winners
Hollins University alumni
National Endowment for the Arts Fellows
People from Gulfport, Mississippi
Writers from Mississippi
Poets Laureate of Mississippi
Writers from Georgia (U.S. state)
Radcliffe fellows
1966 births
Living people
African-American poets
American women poets
American Poets Laureate
Writers of American Southern literature
21st-century American poets
21st-century American women writers
21st-century African-American women writers
21st-century African-American writers
20th-century African-American people
20th-century African-American women
Members of the American Philosophical Society
Members of the American Academy of Arts and Letters